The 2023 MLS SuperDraft was the 24th edition of the SuperDraft conducted by Major League Soccer. It was held on December 21, 2022, becoming the first SuperDraft to be held in December, but will retain the 2023 branding. The draft was conducted via conference call and streamed online. Previously, the SuperDraft had been held in conjunction with the annual January United Soccer Coaches convention.

Since 2021, the SuperDraft has consisted of three rounds. Teams that received fourth-round picks for this draft via past trades received compensatory picks instead. The first overall pick is awarded to expansion team St. Louis City SC and the remaining picks are set by 2022 regular season and post-season results in reverse order.

Format
The SuperDraft format has remained constant throughout its history and closely resembles that of the NFL Draft:

Any expansion teams receive the first picks. MLS announced that St. Louis City SC would debut in 2023 instead of 2022, and the league's expansion to Sacramento was put on hiatus indefinitely.
Non-playoff clubs receive the next picks in reverse order of prior season finish.
Teams that made the MLS Cup Playoffs are then ordered by which round of the playoffs they are eliminated.
The winners of the MLS Cup are given the last selection, and the losers the penultimate selection.

Player selection

Round 1

Round 2

Round 3

Round 4
Compensatory pick for a trade done before the SuperDraft was downsized to only three rounds.

Notable undrafted players

Homegrown players

Eligible players who signed outside of MLS in 2023 
This is a list of eligible players who signed in leagues outside of MLS prior to the SuperDraft, but were still draft eligible.

Other notable players

Summary

Selections by college athletic conference

Schools with multiple draft selections

2023 SuperDraft trades
Round 1

Round 2

Round 3

Compensatory picks

References 

Major League Soccer drafts
SuperDraft
MLS SuperDraft